Lympne Escarpment is a  biological Site of Special Scientific Interest west of Hythe in Kent. Part of it is the remains of a Saxon Shore fort now called Stutfall Castle, which is a Scheduled Monument.

This steeply sloping site has woodland and grassland on Kentish ragstone, with many springs and flushes at the base. It is close to the sea, and the resulting high humidity allows plants such as stinking iris, which are usually confined to woods, to grow in grassland.

Public footpaths cross the site.

References

Sites of Special Scientific Interest in Kent